At Basin Street East may refer to:

 At Basin Street East (Billy Eckstine and Quincy Jones album), 1961
 Live at Basin Street East, a 1964 album by Ray Bryant
 Recorded "Live" at Basin Street East, a 1963 album by Lambert, Hendricks & Bavan